The Andorra Davis Cup team represents Andorra in Davis Cup tennis competition and are governed by the Federació Andorrana de Tennis.

Andorra currently competes in the Europe Zone of Group IV, and have done so since 2008.  They reached Group II in 2003, losing to Greece in the first round 1-4 and to Egypt 2-3 in the relegation play-off.

Jean-Baptiste Poux-Gautier holds most if not all of Andorra's individual player records.

History
Andorra competed in its first Davis Cup in 2000, beginning in Europe Group IV.  For much of its history, the team has yo-yoed up and down group levels.  They won promotion to Group 3 in 2001, and then promotion to Group 2 the following year.

In 2003 in Europe/Africa Group II, Andorra lost to Greece in their first round tie 1-4, in a tie played in April at the Poliesportiv d'Andorra on indoor carpet.  In the opening rubber, Kenneth Tuilier-Curco was soundly beaten by Vasilis Mazarakis 1-6, 0-6, 1-6.  In the next match, Andorra's second winningest player in its history, Joan Jimenez-Herrara, fared better but still bowed out in straight sets, to Konstantinos Economidis 4-6, 4-6, 3-6.  Jimenez-Herrara and Pau Gerbaud-Farras fought back from two sets down in the doubles rubber but lost the fifth set to Mazarakis and Economidis 4-6.  Marc Vilanova was credited with a consolation dead rubber match win in a walk over his opponent.

In July of the same year Andorra faced Egypt in a tie that saw the winner remain in Europe/Africa Group 2.  Also played at the Poliesportiv d'Andorra, the home side went up 1-0 when Joan Jimenez-Herrara took the opening set over Mohamed Mamoun in four sets.  Tuilier-Curco however could only manage to win a set as he fell to Egyptian No. 1 Karim Maamoun, 2-6, 0-6, 7-6(0), 1-6. Things started brightly for Andorra in the doubles rubber, as Jimenez-Herrara and Pau Gerbaud-Farras took the first set in the doubles rubber, 6–4.  Egypt won the next three closely contested sets however, 6-7, 4-6, 4-6, to take a 2 match to 1 lead in the tie.  The fourth rubber pitted the top singles players of both countries: Jimenez-Herrara twice took a one-set lead only to see Maamoun win the deciding set 8–6, sealing Egypt's victory and Andorra relegation to Group 3.

The following year Andorra was demoted to Group 4, but won promotion back to Group 3 in 2005.  They went back down to Group 4 the following year, but stayed at that level just one year, yet again.  Since 2008, however, the team has remained in Europe/Africa Group III.

Andorra did not compete from 2012 to 2015. It came back to the competition for the 2016 edition, where it finished in the 9th position of the European Group III.

Current team (2022)

 Damien Gelabert 
 Èric Cervós Noguer
 Jordi Trilla Clanchet (Junior player)
 Jean-Baptiste Poux-Gautier (Captain-player)

All players

References

External links

Davis Cup teams
Davis Cup
Davis Cup